The Barue uprising (also known as the Barue revolt or the Barue rebellion) was an uprising in 1917 during WW1 in Portuguese Mozambique.

The colonial authorities in Portuguese Mozambique increased the brutality of their occupation during the war. "Revolting practices" criticised by the British, such as forced labour, were increasingly applied despite the abolition of slavery. Press gangs (cipais) used the most brutal coercion to mobilise whole populations, young, old and infirm people not being exempted and women being raped. By the end of 1916, many young men had fled to Southern Rhodesia and Transvaal to escape the Portuguese and to earn living wages. The condition of the populations left behind worsened to the point that when the cipais tried to raise another 5,000 carriers from the kingdom of Barue in March 1917, the population rebelled. Disgust at Portuguese depredations united many peoples but the rivals for the title of Makombe of the Wabarue fought independent campaigns, attracting support from the bandits in the Zambesi valley. At the end of April, the rebels routed a Portuguese force sent to suppress the rising and reached the provincial capital of Tete; by the end of May had overrun most of Zambezia Province. About 100,000 people crossed the border into British Nyasaland and the Rhodesian colonies to escape the violence but the disruption did little to alter British disdain for Portuguese methods and despite having received troops to help put down the Chilembwe rebellion, they refused to send troops, only allowing guns and ammunition over the border. In May the Portuguese began to suppress the rebels by butchering thousands of people, enslaving women and plundering territory. The rebels held out into November and the rivals for the title of Makombe fled to Southern Rhodesia. During June the Portuguese had to divide their forces and send thousands of Portuguese and local troops to attack the Makonde living on the Mvua plateau, who had also rebelled. Another rebellion broke out early in 1918.

References

Bibliography
 

History of Mozambique
1917 in Portuguese Mozambique
Rebellions in Africa
Portugal in World War I
African resistance to colonialism